Yu Bo (born July 22, 1976) is a Chinese actor.

Biography 
Yu was born on July 22, 1976 in Shenyang, Liaoning. From 1996 to 1999 he worked at the Diaoyutai State Guesthouse in Beijing as a security guard.

He entered the Beijing Film Academy in 1999, and graduated in 2003. While a student there, he was chosen to star in the 2003 television series Treasure Raiders opposite Nicky Wu. The role made him nationally famous. He later appeared in many films and TV series, including the 2013 film Saving General Yang, for which he was nominated for the best action movie actor in the 2015 Shanghai International Film Festival.

Filmography

Film

References

1976 births
Living people
Male actors from Shenyang
Chinese male film actors
Chinese male television actors
21st-century Chinese male actors
Beijing Film Academy alumni